Something is an album by organist Shirley Scott recorded in 1970 and released on the Atlantic label. It includes instrumental covers of several contemporary hits from artists such as the Beatles and the Jackson 5, along with the original song "Messie Bessie".

Track listing 
 "Games People Play (Joe South) – 3:52     
 "Because" (John Lennon, Paul McCartney) – 3:46     
 "Can I Change My Mind" (Barry Despenza, Carl Wolfolk) – 2:57     
 "Someday We'll Be Together" (Jackey Beavers, Johnny Bristol, Harvey Fuqua) – 3:04     
 "Something" (George Harrison) – 3:28     
 "I Want You Back" (Berry Gordy, Alphonso Mizell, Freddie Perren, Deke Richards) – 2:41     
 "Messie Bessie" (Shirley Scott) – 4:18     
 "Brand New Me" (Theresa Bell, Jerry Butler, Kenny Gamble) – 4:10  
Recorded at Atlantic Studios in New York City on February 24 (tracks 2, 3 & 5), February 25 (tracks 1, 6 & 8) and February 26 (tracks 4 & 7), 1970

Personnel 
 Shirley Scott – organ, ondioline
 Billy Butler, Eric Gale – guitar 
 Chuck Rainey – electric bass
 Jimmy Johnson – drums
 Ralph MacDonald – congas (tracks 1, 6 & 8)

References 

1970 albums
Albums produced by Joel Dorn
Atlantic Records albums
Shirley Scott albums